Skybucket Records, based in Birmingham, Alabama was formed in the summer of 2002 to release a CD sampler of local music. After the success of this initial release, Skybucket continued to grow, concentrating on signing local musicians and independently releasing their recordings.

Five years after the compilation, Skybucket Records had seventeen releases under its belt.

Artists

Artists with releases on the Skybucket Records label include Dan Sartain, Barton Carroll, The Dexateens, 13ghosts, Through the Sparks, Taylor and the Puffs, and Wes McDonald.

External links
 Skybucket Records

References

American record labels
Record labels established in 2002
2002 establishments in Alabama